Earl Franklin Crowder (January 21, 1915 – February 6, 1984) was an American football player. A native of Cherokee, Oklahoma, he played college football for Oklahoma. He was a member of the 1938 Oklahoma Sooners football team that was undefeated in the regular season. He was selected by the  Chicago Cardinals in the 10th round (82nd overall pick) of the 1939 NFL Draft. He appeared in nine NFL games. He died from cancer at age 69 in Cherokee.

References

1915 births
1984 deaths
Chicago Cardinals players
Cleveland Rams players
Oklahoma Sooners football players
Players of American football from Oklahoma